Awaara, also written Awāra and known overseas as The Vagabond, is a 1951 Indian Hindi crime drama film, produced and directed by Raj Kapoor, and written by Khwaja Ahmad Abbas. It stars Raj Kapoor along with his real-life father Prithviraj Kapoor, as well as Nargis, Leela Chitnis and K. N. Singh. Other members of the Kapoor family make an appearance, including Raj's youngest real-life brother Shashi Kapoor, who plays the younger version of his character, and Prithiviraj's father Dewan Basheshwarnath Kapoor, playing a cameo role in his only film appearance. The film's music was composed by Shankar Jaikishan.

The film expresses socialist themes, and blends social and reformist themes with the crime, romantic comedy and musical melodrama genres. The plot centers on the intertwining lives of a poor thief Raj (played by Raj Kapoor), the privileged Rita (played by Nargis), and Judge Raghunath (played by Prithviraj Kapoor) who is unaware that Raj is his son. In the film, Kapoor's poor "little tramp" character references Charlie Chaplin and was further developed in other Kapoor films such as Shree 420. Awaara is considered a milestone in the history of Bollywood.

The film became an overnight sensation in South Asia, and found even greater success abroad in the Soviet Union, East Asia, Africa, the Caribbean, the Middle East, and Eastern Europe. In particular, the song "Awaara Hoon" ("I am a Vagabond"), sung by Mukesh with lyrics by Shailendra, became hugely popular across the Indian subcontinent, as well as in countries such as the Soviet Union, China, Bulgaria, Turkey, Afghanistan, and Romania. The film was also nominated for the Grand Prize at the Cannes Film Festival in 1953. The film is estimated to have sold over million tickets overseas, including more than 100million in China and about 100million in the Soviet Union. Owing to its popularity in so many countries, the film is a candidate for the most successful film of all time. In 2012, Awaara was included in the 20 new entries to All-Time 100 greatest films by Time magazine.

Plot
Raghunath is a wealthy district judge. He convicts Jagga, son of a criminal, of rape with thin evidence. He believes that "good people are born to good people, and criminals are born to criminals." Jagga later escapes and kidnaps the judge's wife Leela for revenge. When he finds out that she has just become pregnant, he releases her after four days and plans a different kind of revenge. People suspect her faithfulness to her husband and the judge throws her out of the house, rejecting her pleas that the child is his.

Leela gives birth to Raj on the streets and they live in poverty. Raj befriends Rita in school. He is removed from the school rolls while trying to maintain a job as a shoeshine and Rita moves to another city. Jagga convinces Raj to steal in order to save his starving mother. Raj grows up into a skilled criminal, going in and out of jail, and working for Jagga's gang. Leela thinks that he is a businessman. Raj never forgets Rita, keeping her birthday picture in his home.

For a bank robbery, Jagga asks Raj to steal an automobile. He snatches a woman's purse when she steps out of the car, but finds no keys. He pretends to pursue the thief in order to ward off any suspicion and returns the purse to the woman, who is charmed by his personality and apparent selflessness. Later, when Raj successfully steals a car, he hides from the police in a mansion where he meets the same woman. Seeing the same birthday picture, Raj realises that she is his school friend Rita. He tells Rita he's a thief but his figurative statements makes her think he is a finance professional. Rita, now studying law, is a ward of the judge who is suspicious when he hears that Raj doesn't know who his father is. Raj and Rita fall in love. Worrying that Rita will not accept him due to his thievery, Raj starts working at a factory. He's fired him when the manager finds out that he was a thief.

Rita invites him to her birthday party. Raj goes back to Jagga for a money loan so that he can buy a gift for her. Jagga mocks his attempts to reform and asks him to commit more crimes. Raj refuses but later steals a necklace from a man on the street, not knowing the man was the Judge. At Rita's birthday, when Raj gives her a necklace without a case and the Judge gives her a case without a necklace, she realises that Raj is indeed a thief. Rita goes to Raj's mother and learns his whole life story. She decides that Raj is not bad, but was forced into committing crimes by bad influence and the desperation of living in poverty. Raj is ashamed, still believing he is no good for her, but she forgives him.

Raj goes to the Judge to ask if he can marry Rita, but the Judge turns him away. Meanwhile, Jagga and the gang commit the bank robbery, but it goes wrong and they have to run from the police. Jagga hides in Raj's house, where Leela recognizes him and he attacks her. Raj enters and fights him off, killing Jagga in self-defense. Raj goes on trial for Jagga's death with Raghunath as the judge. When Leela goes to the courthouse to provide her eyewitness account, she sees Raghunath and chases after him but is struck by a car. Rita collects the testimony from Leela in the hospital, and later Raj is allowed to visit her. Leela tells Raj that the judge is his father and asks her son to forgive him. But Raj becomes angrier at the judge for making him and his mother suffer. He escapes from jail and tries to kill the judge for revenge, but is stopped by Rita. Rita defends Raj in the trial for assault, who reveals the father-son relationship. Raj chooses not to defend his actions and says that he is a bad man. He asks the court not to think of him, but the millions of other children who grow up in poverty and end up turning to crime because high society does not care about them. While he awaits his verdict, Raj is visited by Judge Raghunath, who finally accepts that Raj is his son and tearfully asks for forgiveness. In the end, Raj is spared execution but sentenced to 3 years in prison for his crime. He promises that after getting released, he will reform himself for Rita, who promises to wait for him.

Cast
 Prithviraj Kapoor as Judge Raghunath
 Raj Kapoor as Raj
 Nargis as Rita
 K. N. Singh as Jagga
 Cuckoo as Bar dancer
 B. M. Vyas as Dubey 
 Leela Mishra as Raghunath's Sister-In-Law
 Leela Chitnis as Leela
 Shashi Kapoor as Young Raj
 Baby Zubeida as Young Rita
 Honey O'Brien as Dancer
 Basheshwarnath Kapoor as Judge
Supporting cast 
 Rajoo, Mansaram, Rajan, Manek Kapoor, Paryag, Ravi, Vinni, Bali, Shinde.

Soundtrack
The music for this film was composed by Shankar Jaikishan while the songs were written by Shailendra and Hasrat Jaipuri. The soundtrack was listed by Planet Bollywood as number 3 on their list of 100 Greatest Bollywood Soundtracks. The song Awaara Hoon was used in the Malayalam Film Vishnulokam directed by Kamal starring Mohanlal. Awaara was the best-selling Bollywood soundtrack album of the 1950s.

Production
The film is a collaboration of the famous team of director/producer Raj Kapoor and writer Khwaja Ahmad Abbas. K. A. Abbas originally wanted Mehboob Khan to direct the film, but the two disagreed over the casting. Khan wanted Ashok Kumar to play the judge and Dilip Kumar the son. In the event, Abbas withdrew his script from Mehboob Studios and Raj Kapoor decided to direct it. This film was filmed in RK Studio and Bombay.

In his column for the Indian Express, Kapoor wrote, "In Awara I tried to prove that Vagabonds are not born, but are created in the slums of our modern cities, in the midst of dire poverty and evil environment."

Critical reception
It was entered in the 1953 Cannes Film Festival, where it was nominated for the Grand Prize of the Festival (Palme d'Or). In 1955, it was voted the best film of the year by readers of Turkish daily Milliye.

In 2003, Time magazine included it in a list of "10 Indian Films to Treasure". Time magazine also chose Raj Kapoor's performance in Awaara as one of the top ten greatest performances of all time. In 2005, Indiatimes Movies ranked the movie amongst the "Top 25 Must See Bollywood Films", writing: "Whenever Raj Kapoor and Nargis came together on screen, sparks flew. Their chemistry was electrifying and it crackles with raw passion in Raj Kapoor's Awaara. Nargis's wild and carefree sensuality pulsates and Raj Kapoor's scruffy hair-rebellious persona only adds fuel to the fire". Time magazine included the film among the 20 new entries added to All-Time 100 greatest films in 2012.

Box office

This record was later beaten the next year by Mehboob Khan's Aan (1952), starring Dilip Kumar, which grossed  in 1952.

In Turkey, Awaara released in 1955. The film sold 100,000 tickets in its first week of release in Turkey. The total number of box office admissions in Turkey is currently unknown.

Soviet Union
In the Soviet Union, Awaara was released in 1954, debuting at Indian film festivals in Moscow and Leningrad which drew about  viewers in four days. By the end of the year, it drew an audience of about 64million viewers in its initial run, the highest for any film in the Soviet Union at the time, until its record was surpassed by Amphibian Man in 1962. At the Soviet box office, Awaara remained the most-viewed Indian film, the third biggest foreign hit of all time, and one of the top 20 biggest hits of all time.

In terms of gross revenue, Awaara earned 29million Rbls ($7.25million) in its initial run, surpassing Aan to become the highest-grossing Indian film overseas at the time. Awaaras 29million руб was eventually surpassed by Disco Dancer (1982), which grossed 60 million руб in the Soviet Union. Including re-runs, which were running for 10–12 years, Awaaras footfalls in the Soviet Union amounted to about 100million box office admissions, which remains among the highest for an Indian film in an overseas market.

China
The film was also a success in China, where it first released in 1955. Prior to its 1978 re-release, the film's initial run had sold a total of 40million tickets in China.

The film's 1978 re-release was a greater commercial success in China. Following its re-release, the film went on to sell a total of more than 100million tickets, and was the second highest-grossing Indian film in China behind only Nasir Hussain's Caravan (1971).

Legacy
The song "Awaara Hoon" and actor Raj Kapoor were widely known across China and the Soviet Union. The film's success in both the Soviet Union and China has been attributed to the socialist themes expressed in the film.

The film Awaara and the song "Awaara Hoon" are believed to have been among Chairman Mao's favourite films and songs, respectively. Awaara was referenced in the 2000 Chinese film Platform.

Remakes
Due to the film's remarkable success with Turkish audiences, Awaara was remade in Turkey a total of eight times. The first and most prominent Turkish film remake was Avare (1964) starring actor Sadri Alışık and actress Ajda Pekkan.

There was also an Iranian film remake, called The Wheel of the Universe (1967). However, this version may have been a remake of the Turkish remake Avare, rather than a direct remake of the original Awaara.

See also

 "Awaara Hoon"
 100 Crore Club
 Bollywood
 List of films by box office admissions
 List of highest-grossing films in the Soviet Union
 List of highest-grossing Indian films
 List of highest-grossing Indian films in overseas markets
 List of highest-grossing non-English films

Notes

References

Bibliography

External links
 
 Full movie on YouTube
 Rediff.com Classics Revisited: Awaara
 Movie review at "Let's talk about Bollywood!"
 University of Iowa article

1951 films
1950s crime comedy-drama films
1950s Hindi-language films
1950s romantic comedy-drama films
Films directed by Raj Kapoor
Hindi films remade in other languages
Films scored by Shankar–Jaikishan
Films with screenplays by Khwaja Ahmad Abbas
Indian courtroom films
Indian crime comedy-drama films
Indian musical comedy-drama films
Indian romantic musical films
Indian romantic comedy-drama films
Melodrama films
1950s Urdu-language films
1951 drama films
Urdu-language Indian films
Indian black-and-white films